Pride is a 1917 American silent drama film directed by Richard Ridgely and starring Holbrook Blinn, Shirley Mason and George LeGuere. It was part of a series featuring portrayals of the seven deadly sins.

Cast
 Holbrook Blinn as Eugene D'Arcy
 Shirley Mason as Eve Leslie
 George LeGuere as Adam Moore
 Helen Strickland as Miss Nelson Blanchard
 Guido Colucci as Le Comte de Frais

References

Bibliography
 Langman, Larry. American Film Cycles: The Silent Era. Greenwood Publishing, 1998.

External links
 

1917 films
1917 drama films
1910s English-language films
American silent feature films
Silent American drama films
American black-and-white films
Triangle Film Corporation films
Films directed by Richard Ridgely
1910s American films